Estadio Capitán Remigio Elías Aguirre Romero is a multi-purpose stadium administrated by the governmental Instituto Peruano del Deporte in Chiclayo, Peru. It was built in 1970 named after the 19th century Peruvian sailor Elías Aguirre Romero. Its current spectator capacity is 23,000 (can be limited to 20,000 for safety reasons) after the renovations performed for the 2004 Copa América, and had artificial turf installed for the 2005 FIFA U-17 World Championship. The most recognized club to play at this stadium is Juan Aurich.

History
Estadio Capitán Remigio Elías Aguirre Romero was built in 1970 and renovated in 2004 for the Copa América Peru was to host. The stadium hosted 5 matches for this tournament in which the national football teams of Peru, Argentina, Mexico, Uruguay, and Ecuador participated. The game that opened the Elías Aguirre's participation in this tournament was a group stage 2–2 draw between Mexico and Uruguay, and the game that closed its participation was a 1–0 Argentina win over hosts Peru in the quarterfinals. The stadium received a minor renovation for the 2005 FIFA U-17 World Championship. The renovations consisted of installing Polytan Ligaturf which received the FIFA 1 star recommended rating. During this championship, the Elías Aguirre hosted 6 matches; 5 group stage matches and 1 semifinal match.

The stadium is administrated by the regional government of Lambayeque and principally used by local teams of Chiclayo which participate in the Copa Perú. Additionally, football club Juan Aurich gained promotion to the Primera División in 2007 after conquering the 2007 Copa Perú. They play in the Primera División since 2008 and qualified to the 2010 Copa Libertadores in which the stadium hosted international matches against the Argentinian defending champions Estudiantes de La Plata and Bolivian Bolívar, Mexican Estudiantes Tecos in addition to local Alianza Lima.

In addition to football events, the stadium can host track and field events and is located within a sports complex.

International matches hosted

References

Juan Aurich
Elias Aguirre
Copa América stadiums
Multi-purpose stadiums in Peru
Sports venues completed in 1970
Buildings and structures in Chiclayo